Thunder Bay/Two Island Lake Water Aerodrome  is located on Two Island Lake,  north of Thunder Bay, Ontario, Canada.

See also
 List of airports in the Thunder Bay area

References

Registered aerodromes in Ontario
Transport in Thunder Bay
Seaplane bases in Ontario